Torsten Winge (10 May 1886 – 6 May 1969) was a Swedish actor. He appeared in more than 50 films between 1917 and 1961.

Selected filmography

 Robinson i skärgården (1920)
 Thomas Graal's Ward (1922)
 Where the Lighthouse Flashes (1924)
 The Lady of the Camellias (1925)
 She Is the Only One (1926)
 Ulla, My Ulla (1930)
 For Her Sake (1930)
 Kanske en gentleman (1935)
 The People of Småland (1935)
 Walpurgis Night (1935)
 Conscientious Objector Adolf (1936)
 The Wedding Trip (1936)
 Thunder and Lightning (1938)
 Nothing But the Truth (1939)
 Bashful Anton (1940)
 Her Melody (1940)
 The Train Leaves at Nine (1941)
Lucky Young Lady (1941)
 Lasse-Maja (1941)
 The Ghost Reporter (1941)
 Poor Ferdinand (1941)
 Dangerous Ways (1942)
 The Heavenly Play (1942)
 Lyckan kommer (1942)
 Mister Collins' Adventure (1943)
 Live Dangerously (1944)
 The Night Watchman's Wife (1947)
 Realm of Man (1949)
 Playing Truant (1949)
 The Quartet That Split Up (1950)
 Seventh Heaven (1956)
 The Girl in Tails (1956)
 Musik ombord (1958)
 The Lady in Black (1958)

References

External links

1886 births
1969 deaths
Swedish male film actors
People from Norrköping